Abdul (also transliterated as Abdal, Abdel, Abdil, Abdol, Abdool, or Abdoul;) is the most frequent transliteration of the combination of the Arabic word Abd (meaning "Servant") and the definite prefix al / el (meaning "the").

It is the initial component of many compound names, names made of two words. For example, usually spelled Abdel Hamid, Abdelhamid, Abd El Hamid or Abdul Hamid, which means "servant of The Praised" (God).

The most common use for Abdul by far, is as part of a male given name, written in English. When written in English, Abdul is subject to variable spacing, spelling, and hyphenation. It is a common name in the Middle East, North Africa, West Africa, East Africa, Central Asia, the Balkans, the Caucasus, and predominantly Muslim countries of South Asia and Southeast Asia. It is also sometimes used amongst African Americans and Turkic peoples of Russia.

The meaning of Abdul literally and normally means "Slave of the", but English translations also often translate it to "Servant of the".

Spelling variations 
Variations in spelling are primarily because of the variation in pronunciation. Arabic speakers normally pronounce and transcribe their names of Arabic origin according to their spoken Arabic dialects. Therefore, it is pronounced  and written Abdel... or Abd El.... For other variations in spelling, see the Arabic grammar section.

Etymology 
In Arabic language, the word   means "slave" or "servant", from the triliteral root  , which is also related to the word  , "worshiping". Therefore, the word has the positive connotation, in an Islamic sense, of worshiping and praising God, i.e. being a servant to God rather than idols.

Theophoric naming 
Essentially there is no Abdul, without the second part when written in Arabic, thus it appears as a component of many Arabic and specifically Muslim names, where it is the opening of a religiously based name, meaning: "Servant of..." with the last component of the name being one of the names of God in Islam, which would form a Muslim Arabic theophoric name. Such as Abdullah simply meaning "Servant of God" while "Abdul Aziz" means "Servant of the Almighty" and so on.
The name Abdul Masih, ("Servant of the Messiah") is an Arabic Christian equivalent.

In addition, Abdul is occasionally, though much more rarely, used in reference to a figure other than God. For example, the Indian name Abdul Mughal, ("Servant of the Mughal Empire").

Derived theophoric names 

The most common names are listed below
 Abdullah, Servant of Allah
 Abdulaziz, Servant of the Almighty
 Abdulkarim, Servant of the most Generous
 Abdurrahim, Servant of the Merciful
 Abdurrahman, Servant of the Benevolent
 Abdussalam, Servant of the Peaceful
 Abdulqadir, Servant of the Powerful
 Abdul Latif, Servant of the Gentle

Arabic grammar 
When followed by a sun letter, the l in al (normally pronounced colloquially el) assimilates to the initial consonant of the following noun, resulting in a doubled consonant. For example, "Abdul Rahman", would be pronounced in Literary Arabic: Abdur-Rahman . When the definite article is followed by a moon letter, no assimilation takes place.

Therefore, Abdul is not always used as the opening part of the name; if the second part starts with a sun letter, it may become forms including Abdun, Abdur, Abdus, or Abdush, the vowel in each name, similarly with Abdul, is also open to differing transliterations.

Independent naming 
Abdul does not appear on its own as a male given name when written in Arabic. In some cultures, the theophoric part may appear to be a stand-alone middle name, or surname, thus confusing people as to whether Abdul is an accepted given name. Often if someone shortens his/her name, he may equally choose the theophoric part or Abdul. However, Abdul by itself is sometimes used as an independent full given first name outside of Arabic-speaking societies. Sometimes Abdul is followed by a word describing Muhammad the Prophet, for example "Abd un Nabi", which means "slave/servant of the prophet".

Given name 
 Abdul Thompson Conteh (born 1970), Sierra Leonean footballer
 Abdul Diallo (born 1985), Burkina Faso footballer
 Abdul "Duke" Fakir (born 1935), American singer, best known as a member of the Four Tops
 Abdul Gaddy (born 1992), American basketball player
 Abdul Hodge (born 1983), American football linebacker
 Abdul Salis (born 1979), British actor
 Abdul Shamsid-Deen (born 1968), American former basketball player
 Abdul Vas (born 1981), Venezuelan artist
 A. P. J. Abdul Kalam (1931 – 2015), 11th President of India
 DJ Abdel, French DJ and producer of Moroccan descent playing hip hop, funk and contemporary R&B

Surname 
 David Abdul (born 1989), Aruban footballer
Kareem Abdul-Jabbar (born 1947), American basketball player
 Lida Abdul (born 1973), Persian artist
 Paula Abdul (born 1962), American singer and television personality

Fictional characters 
 Abdul Alhazred, character created by American horror writer H. P. Lovecraft
 Abdul ibn Shareef, fictional politician on The West Wing
 Mohammed Avdol (also spelled Abdul), fictional character in the manga and anime JoJo's Bizarre Adventure created by Hirohiko Araki

See also 
 Abdu, a nickname for the compound name or a given name. In this case it's not necessarily a name given to a Muslim
 Abdi, similar to Abdu
 Abdiel, Biblical name meaning "Servant of God"
 Abdullah (disambiguation), often confused with having the same meaning as Abdul
 Arabic name
 Composites like Abdel-Halim
 Turkish name

References 

Arabic-language surnames
Arabic masculine given names
Pakistani masculine given names